Jamia Darussalam is an Arabic college founded in 1924 by Kaka Mohammed Oomer in Oomerabad. Jamia Darussalam is an Islamic institution in south India.

History
Jamia Darussalam is an Islamic university founded by an animal skin merchant, Kaka Mohammed Oomer, who laid the foundation for this institution on 7 December 1924 at the newly founded village, named after him as Oomerabad. It came into existence with a program of offering services to cater to the religious, educational, reformative and welfare needs of Muslims and the country at large.

Education
Jamia Darussalam provides education in various Islamic disciplines. It offers postgraduate, undergraduate, diploma and certificate courses. JDSA offers training in four languages; Persian, Arabic, English and Urdu. It also offers  training for memorising the Qur'an.

Notable alumni

Jalaluddin Umri (Ex Amir of Jamaat-e-Islami Hind)

Ziya-ur-Rahman Azmi (Muhadith-al-asar, Author, Scholar, Professor & Ex Dean of Department of Hadith at Islamic University of Madinah)
Dr Mohammad Khan Umri ( Assistant Professor, Department of Islamic Studies, Jamia Millia Islamia, New Delhi 
Hafeez ur Rahman Azami Umri Madani (Former Principal of Jamia Darussalam, Oomerabad )

Links
Oomerabad
Kaka Mohammed Oomer

References

Islamic universities and colleges in India
Madrasas in Tamil Nadu
Madrasas in India
Universities and colleges in Vellore district
Educational institutions established in 1924
1924 establishments in India
Academic institutions formerly affiliated with the University of Madras